USA Water Ski & Wake Sports also known as USA Water Ski is a non-profit water skiing association headquartered in Polk County, Florida whose mission is 'to promote the growth and development of recreational water skiing, and organizing and governing the sport of competitive water skiing."  T
USA Water Ski was founded in 1939 and replaced the American Water Ski Association.  As of 2015, USA Water Ski was the largest water ski federation in the world with more than 600 clubs and 20,000 members.
In 2016, they announced plans for a new training facility, office complex and space for the industry's Hall of Fame and museum in Auburndale, Florida.

See also
List of Water Skiing Hall of Fame Inductees
International Water Ski Federation
Water Ski Hall of Fame and Museum

References
 

Water ski
Companies based in Polk County, Florida
Wakeboarding
Waterskiing